Blake Neely (born April 28, 1969) is an Emmy Award-winning American composer, conductor, and orchestrator. He has been nominated for three Primetime Emmy Awards for his work on Everwood, The Pacific, and Pan Am, and won the Emmy (2021) for The Flight Attendant.

Early life
Neely was born in Paris, Texas. He fell in love with piano at an early age after hearing the music of Steely Dan and Rush. His father was a rancher and professor, and his mother a journalist and author. He studied linguistics at the University of Texas.

Work
Neely has contributed to and been credited on dozens of film and TV projects over the years, such as Everwood (which earned him a 2003 Emmy Award nomination for the theme), the first three Pirates of the Caribbean films, King Kong, The Last Samurai, and The Great Buck Howard. Other film projects in which he is the sole composer are Elvis and Anabelle, Starter for 10, and The Wedding Date.

In addition, Neely has composed the music for over twenty television series, including The Mentalist and You.

He has frequently collaborated with writer/director/producer Greg Berlanti, including on Everwood, Jack & Bobby, Brothers & Sisters, Eli Stone, Dirty Sexy Money, Political Animals, Blindspot, and the Arrowverse series Arrow, The Flash, Supergirl, Legends of Tomorrow and Batwoman.

He has also been credited alongside several well-known composers such as Michael Kamen, James Newton Howard, Vangelis (for his work on the Mythodea project as arranger and conductor), and Hans Zimmer.

As an author, he has written over 25 instrumental method books such as the best-selling piano method Piano For Dummies.

He recorded his score for an HBO documentary on David McCullough at the Conway Studios in Hollywood on February 23, 2008.

Discography/Filmography

References

External links
 Cow on the Wall Official Website
 
 Everwood Music Biography and Everwood Music Interview
 SoundtrackNet Page
 Blake Neely at ScoringSessions.com
 Blake Neely at 8dio.com

1969 births
Living people
American film score composers
University of Texas alumni
People from Paris, Texas